Eeva Irmeli Ahtisaari (née Hyvärinen, born 18 June 1936) is a Finnish teacher and historian who was the First Lady of Finland from 1994 to 2000. She is married to the 10th President of Finland Martti Ahtisaari. Their son is the musician Marko Ahtisaari.

Life 
Eeva Ahtisaari graduated from the University of Helsinki in 1962 and worked as a history teacher in Kuopio, Rovaniemi and Espoo. In 1974–1989, Ahtisaari lived in Tanzania and Namibia as her husband Martti Ahtisaari worked as a diplomat and UN Special Representative. Ahtisaari's autobiography Juuret ja siivet (Roots and Wings) was published in 2002.

On 21 March 2020, it was announced that Eeva Ahtisaari was tested positive for the coronavirus. She attended the International Women's Day concert on 8 March at the Helsinki Music Centre while infected. The former President of Finland Tarja Halonen was also present at the concert but she was not infected.

Honours

National honours
 Grand Cross of the Order of the White Rose of Finland (1994)

Foreign honours
 Order of the Dannebrog
:
 First Class of the Order of the Cross of Terra Mariana (1995)
:
 Grand Cross of the Order of the Falcon (26 September 1995) 
 Commander Grand Cross of the Royal Order of the Polar Star (1994)
 Honorary citizenship (1992)

Literal works 
Yksi kamari – kaksi sukupuolta: Suomen eduskunnan ensimmäiset naiset, Helsinki; Parliament of Finland, 1997. 
Juuret ja siivet, Helsinki; WSOY, 2002. 
Eeva Ahtisaari, Maija Kauppinen, Aura Korppi-Tommola: Tavoitteena tasa-arvo: Suomen Naisyhdistys 125 vuotta, Helsinki; Finnish Literature Society, 2009.

References

1936 births
Living people
People from Varkaus
Finnish schoolteachers
20th-century Finnish historians
First ladies and gentlemen of Finland
Finnish expatriates in Tanzania
Finnish expatriates in Namibia
Finnish women historians
University of Helsinki alumni